Dhanagahalli  is a village in the southern state of Karnataka, India. It is located in the Mysore taluk of Mysore district.

Demographics
 India census, Dhanagalli had a population of 5881 with 3132 males and 2749 females.

See also
 Mysore
 Districts of Karnataka

References

External links

Villages in Mysore district